The list of ship launches in 1905 includes a chronological list of ships launched in 1905.

References

Sources

1905
Ship launches